Odites johannae is a moth in the family Depressariidae. It was described by Pierre Viette in 1987. It is found in the Afrotropical realm.

References

Moths described in 1987
Odites